MU Online is an Isometric medieval fantasy MMORPG, produced by Webzen, a Korean gaming company. Introduced in 2001 it is still being supported and updated in 2022.

Gameplay
MU Online was created in December 2001 by the Korean gaming company WEBZEN Inc. Like most MMORPGs, players create a character among nine different classes and set foot on the MU Continent. To gain experience and thus level up, a player needs to fight monsters (mobs). MU is populated by a large variety of monsters, from simple ones like goblins and golems, to more challenging ones such as the Gorgon, Kundun or Selupan. Each monster type is unique, has different spawn points, and drops different items. 
Outside of a duel, PvP fighting is possible but discouraged.  When one player attacks another, a self-defense system is activated, in which the attacked player may kill the aggressor within a time limit.  Self-defense is also activated when a player attacks an Elf's summoned creature.  Outlaws have disadvantages during gameplay, depending on their Outlaw level.

Character classes
At the start of the game the players can choose between 13 different character classes - Dark Wizard, Dark Knight, Elf, Summoner, Rage Fighter, Magic Gladiator, Dark Lord, Grow Lancer, Rune Wizard, Slayer, Gun Crusher, White Mage Kundun, Mage Lemuria, Illusion Knight. Players can unlock two classes if they reach a certain level with one character: Magic Gladiator, and Dark Lord. Also, character cards can be purchased in order to unlock more character classes. Each class has its specific powers and items. As characters level up and complete quests, they can transform themselves into stronger classes. Each progressive class change grants, gain access to new spells, skills, weapons and wings as well as an associated change in appearance.

Spells and skills
Like most MMO games, characters in MU can use many different kinds of magic and special abilities. Each character has its own set of spells, and some weapons may be enchanted to provide the character with a specific spell. Casting a spell costs MP (mana, or magic point) and sometimes AG or stamina.

Communications
Mu Online has a built-in chat system that allows all visible players to communicate easily via text. Users can add custom players to their Friends List in order to make it easy to keep in contact with one another. Other methods of chat were also available, such as Guild chat and Party chat.

Cooperative Play
Players can choose to team up with other players in a "party", in which players cooperate against enemy monsters to share exp and loot. Early seasons of the game encouraged party play by rewarding the player with the highest level more experience points for helping lower-level players. Players could not see the level of other players in the party, but because spending character points on vitality was highly discouraged, players could guess quite accurately the level of other players by seeing their health bars. Some builds were made for parties only, like the part elf, which focused on filling up the energy stat, being protected by a summoned mob, and buffing party members.

Sequels
MU Legend was released in August 2018 free on Steam via Valofe
MU Origin was released in 2016
MU Origin 2 was updated May 2022 on Google Play, with versions uploaded by GameNow and Webzen
MU Origin 3 was updated June 2022 on Google Play by FingerFun

See also
 List of MMORPGs
 Mu

References

External links

 MU Online Webzen - Official MU Online Web site

2001 video games
Active massively multiplayer online games
Massively multiplayer online role-playing games
Action role-playing video games
Video games developed in South Korea
Windows games
Windows-only games
Webzen games
Asiasoft games